Erida may refer to:
 718 Erida, minor planet orbiting the Sun named for Erida Leuschner, daughter of astronomer Armin Otto Leuschner
 Erida (goddess), alternative name for Eris in mythology – noted as the goddess of Hate in the Iliad
 Erida (name), list of feminine given names
 Erida (2021 Movie), Malayalam movie released in 2021